The Banbury by-election, 1918 was a parliamentary by-election held for the British House of Commons constituency of Banbury, sometimes also referred to as North Oxfordshire' on 24 September 1918. The seat had become vacant upon the appointment of the sitting  Liberal MP, Sir Eustace Fiennes, to become Governor of the Seychelles.

The Liberal candidate, Colonel Rhys Williams, had been adopted by Banbury Liberal Association in preference to their previously selected candidate. It was reported he would stand as an Independent Liberal but in support of the then Coalition government of prime minister David Lloyd George. Williams was returned unopposed.

References

See also
 List of United Kingdom by-elections (1900–1918)
 1922 Banbury by-election

1918 elections in the United Kingdom
1918 in England
20th century in Oxfordshire
September 1918 events
Unopposed by-elections to the Parliament of the United Kingdom in English constituencies
By-elections to the Parliament of the United Kingdom in Oxfordshire constituencies
Banbury